Ernest P. Briggs Jr. (1923–1984) was a second-generation Abstract Expressionist painter known for his expressive, sometimes calligraphic brushwork, his geometric compositions, and revolution in abstract painting that secured New York City's position as the art capital of the world in the post-World War II period.

Biography
Briggs was born on December 24, 1923, in San Diego, California. He went on to serve in the U.S. Army Air Forces during World War II (1943–1946), where he spent 18 months in Tampa and a year in India.

Briggs studied painting at the Schaeffer School of Design, San Francisco, California (1946–47) and later at The California School of Fine Arts, San Francisco (1947-1951), where he thrived under the tutelage of such ab-ex greats as Clyfford Still, Ad Reinhardt, David Park, and Mark Rothko. According to New York Times critic Grace Glueck, Briggs was largely impacted by the "painterly rhetoric" of his teacher Clyfford Still during and after his time at CSFA.

Considered a member of the second generation of Abstract Expressionists, along with Giorgio Cavallon, Briggs left California for New York in 1953 where he began exhibiting at the Stable Gallery. During the 1950s, he was able to make a name for himself through his explosive and dynamic style as part of the New York City avant-garde. Briggs brought to the East Coast a fresh, lively aesthetic, reflecting what has been termed a "radical West Coast style" that he had continued to develop since his days at the California School of Fine Arts in San Francisco. He participated in several Whitney Museum Annuals and in 1956 was included in the Museum of Modern Art’s exhibition “12 Americans” curated by Dorothy Miller. He taught painting and sculpture at the Pratt Institute in Brooklyn from 1961 until the time of his death at age 61, and is survived by his wife Anne Arnold, who is also an artist.

The dynamism and at some points discord in Briggs' work is best suggested by the following quote from his obituary, published on June 14, 1984, in The New York Times:

"Sometimes Mr. Briggs's emphasis was on strong, lyrical color and thick brush strokes that called attention to the act of painting. Sometimes, as in his exhibition earlier this year at the Gruenebaum Gallery in New York, his work was more linear and geometric, and the expressive element was dependent upon a strong, almost translucent light within grays and blues."

Selected solo exhibitions
1949: (first) Metart Gallery, San Francisco, California
1954/55: Stable Gallery, New York City
1956: San Francisco Art Association Gallery, California
1960/62/63: The Howard Wise Gallery, New York
1968: Yale University, New Haven, Connecticut
1969: Alonzo Gallery, New York
1973: Green Mountain Gallery, New York
1975: Susan Caldwell Gallery, Inc., New York
1977: Aaron Berman Gallery, New York
1980: Landmark Gallery, New York
1980/82: Gruenebaum Gallery, New York
1984: Memorial Exhibition, Gruenebaum Gallery
1991: With Edward Dugmore, Anita Shapolsky Gallery, New York City
1992: With Ibram Lassaw, Anita Shapolsky Gallery
1994: With Clement Meadmore and Erik van der Grijn, Anita Shapolsky Gallery
1996: Two Painters and a Sculptor (with Clement Meadmore and Erik van der Grijn), Anita Shapolsky Gallery
1998: Abstract Paintings from the 1950s to the 1970s (with Michael Loew), Anita Shapolsky Gallery
2001: Anita Shapolsky Gallery
2002: Abstract Expressionist Paintings from the 1950s, Mishkin Gallery, Baruch College, City University of New York
2004: Ernest Briggs: Paintings of the 50s and 60s, Anita Shapolsky Gallery
2005: Ernest Briggs: Paintings of 50s & 60s, Anita Shapolsky Gallery
2006-07: Nassos Daphnis & Ernest Briggs: OPPOSING FORCES, Anita Shaplosky Gallery

Selected group exhibitions
1948/49/53: San Francisco Art Association Annuals
1953: Five Bay Area Artists, California Palace of the Legion of Honor, San Francisco, California
1955/56/61: Annuals and Biennials, Whitney Museum of American Art, New York City
1956: 12 Americans, circle, Museum of Modern Art, New York City
1961: Corcoran Gallery of Art, Washington, D.C.; Carnegie Institute of Technology, Pittsburgh, Pennsylvania
1962/1961, Dallas Museum of Art, Dallas, Texas; Contemporary Art Exhibition, San Francisco Museum of Modern Art, California
1963: Directions-Painting-USA, San Francisco Museum of Modern Art, San Francisco
1967: Large–Scale American Painting, Jewish Museum, New York; Johnson Museum, Cornell University, Ithaca, New York
1969, 70: American Academy of Arts and Letters, New York
1970: Proctor Art Center, Bard College, Annandale-on-Hudson, New York; San Francisco 1945-1950, Oakland Art Museum, California
1976: California Painting and Sculpture: The Modern Era, San Francisco Museum of Modern Art, California
1977: Bay Area Update, Huntsville Museum of Art, Alabama
1978: Cape Split Place, Addison, Maine
1984: Underknown, Institute for Art & Urban Resources, P.S. 1, Long Island City, New York
1989: Anne Weber Gallery, Georgetown, Maine; Portland Museum of Art, Maine
1991: The Prevailing Fifties, also with Edward Dugmore, Anita Shapolsky Gallery, New York City 
1992: The Tradition, also with Ibram Lassaw, Anita Shapolsky Gallery
1994: New York–Provincetown: A 50s Connection, Provincetown Art Association and Museum, Massachusetts; Maryland Art Institute, Maryland 
1994/96: Josiah White Exhibition Center, Jim Thorpe, Pennsylvania
1995: The Fifties, Anita Shapolsky Gallery 
1996: Other Artists of the 50s, Kendall Campus Art Gallery, Miami–Dade Community College, Florida; The San Francisco School of Abstract Expressionism, San Francisco Museum of Modern Art, California 
1997: Artists of the 1950s, Part 1 and 2, Anita Shapolsky Gallery
1998: Paper Works, Anita Shapolsky Gallery
1998-99: Artists of the 50s; The Development of Abstraction, Anita Shapolsky Gallery
1999: Abstract Expressionist Tradition, Anita Shapolsky Gallery
2000: Art For Art’s Sake–Credo of the Fifties, Anita Shapolsky Gallery
2004: San Francisco and the Second Wave: The Blair Collection of Bay Area Abstract Expressionism, Crocker Art Museum, Sacramento, California; Re-Examining Abstract Art, Part 2, Anita Shapolsky Gallery; New York School Artists: Works Of the 50s and 60s, Anita Shapolsky Gallery
2005: While Pollock Was Sleeping: Bay Area Abstract Expressionism from the Blair Collection, Laguna Art Museum, Laguna Beach, California; The Invisible In The Visible, Anita Shapolsky Gallery

Selected public collections
 Brooklyn Museum, Brooklyn, New York
 Carnegie Institute, Pittsburgh, Pennsylvania
 Rockefeller Institute, New York City
 Smithsonian Institution, Washington, DC,
 San Francisco Museum of Modern Art, California
 San Jose Museum of Art, San Jose, California
 Oakland Museum of California, Oakland, California
 Portland Museum of Art, Portland, Maine
 Walker Art Center, Minneapolis, Minnesota
 Whitney Museum of American Art, New York City

References

Sources
12 Americans (edited by Dorothy C. Miller; Published by the Museum of Modern Art, New York, NY, 1956.) OCLC:	510514
San Francisco and the second wave : the Blair collection of Bay area abstract expressionism, (Sacramento, CA : Crocker Art Museum, 2004.) 
Painting and sculpture in California, the modern era, (San Francisco: The Museum, 1977.) OCLC: 3370173
 Out of Darkness, Light, (by Bruce Nixon, in Arts and Antiques, October 2012)

Books
Thomas Albright, Art in the San Francisco Bay area, 1945-1980 : an illustrated history, (Berkeley, Calif. : University of California Press, ©1985.) 
 Susan Landauer, The San Francisco school of abstract expressionism (Berkeley : University of California Press, ©1996.) 
Marika Herskovic, American Abstract Expressionism of the 1950s An Illustrated Survey, (New York School Press, 2003.) . pp. 54–57
Marika Herskovic, New York School Abstract Expressionists Artists Choice by Artists, (New York School Press, 2000.) . p. 32; p. 36
Marika Herskovic, American Abstract and Figurative Expressionism Style Is Timely Art Is Timeless (New York School Press, 2009.) . pp. 52–55

External links
Ernest Briggs paintings-from the exhibition at the Mishkin Gallery, Baruch College, New York City

1923 births
1984 deaths
Abstract expressionist artists
20th-century American painters
American male painters
United States Army Air Forces personnel of World War II
Modern painters
Painters from California
Painters from New York City
United States Army Air Forces soldiers
20th-century American male artists